The 2018–19 Coupe de France preliminary rounds, Bourgogne-Franche-Comté was the qualifying competition to decide which teams from the leagues of the Bourgogne-Franche-Comté region of France took part in the main competition from the seventh round.

First round 
These matches were played on 18 and 19 August 2018.

Second round 
These matches were played on 25 and 26 August 2018.

Third round 
These matches were played on 15 and 16 September 2018. Included in the draw is AS Saint Pierraise from the Overseas Collectivity of Saint Pierre and Miquelon.

Fourth round 
These matches were played on 29 and 30 September 2018.

Fifth round 
These matches were played on 13 and 14 October 2018.

Sixth round 
These matches were played on 27 and 28 October 2018.

References 

2018–19 Coupe de France